The  was a DC electric multiple unit (EMU) commuter train type operated by the private railway operator Tobu Railway in Japan between 1961 and 1993.

Originally built for use on inter-running services between the Tobu Isesaki Line and Tokyo Metro Hibiya Line, two sets were later rebuilt for use on the Tobu Noda Line.

Variants
 2000 series: 4-car, 6-car, and ultimately 8-car sets used on Tobu Isesaki Line and Tokyo Metro Hibiya Line inter-running services
 2080 series: Two 6-car sets rebuilt from 2000 series cars in 1988 for use on the Tobu Noda Line

History
Ten four-car sets were introduced from 1961 on inter-running services between the Tobu Isesaki Line and Tokyo Metro Hibiya Line.
 These were lengthened to six cars per set in 1964 to cope with increased ridership, and ten more six-car sets were delivered between May 1966 and September 1970. The fleet was increased to eight cars per set from May 1972.

Two six-car sets were rebuilt from 2000 series cars in 1988 with new cab fronts for use on the Tobu Noda Line, and reclassified 2080 series. These two sets were withdrawn in 1992.

The last remaining 2000 series sets were withdrawn in 1993.

None of the Tobu 2000 Series cars were preserved.

Formations

2000 series
The eight-car sets (2101 to 2120) were formed as follows.

The "M" and "Mc" cars were each fitted with one lozenge-type pantograph.

2080 series
The two six-car 2080 series sets (2181 and 2182) were formed as follows.

The 2180 and 2580 cars each had one lozenge-type pantograph.

Conversion and renumbering details
The former identities of the 2080 series cars were as shown below.

References

Electric multiple units of Japan
2000 series
Train-related introductions in 1961
1500 V DC multiple units of Japan
Fuji rolling stock